Chuck Mitchell was an actor.

Chuck Mitchell may also refer to:

Chuck Mitchell, Joni Mitchell's first husband
Chuck Mitchell, fictional character in Are We Done Yet?
Detective Chuck Mitchell, fictional character in Police Station
Chuck Mitchell, fictional character in The Conners

See also
Chucky Mitchell, footballer
Charles Mitchell (disambiguation)